"Rocket Skates" is a song by the American alternative metal band Deftones. It was the second single released from Deftones' sixth studio album, Diamond Eyes. It was also the first single released without bassist Chi Cheng, who was in a coma during its recording, following a car accident in October 2008. The single was recorded with former Quicksand bassist Sergio Vega, who played bass on the entirety of Diamond Eyes. It was later released as a limited edition 7" vinyl single for international Record Store Day on April 17, 2010, serving as the second overall single.

Release
Deftones began incorporating "Rocket Skates" into their live set list as early as October 2009. As part of a promotion for Diamond Eyes, a free download of the single was made available for 24 hours on February 23, 2010 through the band's website, accompanying new information about the album. The surge of visitors trying to download the track crashed the website's servers, resulting in temporary technical difficulties. It was later made available on digital music retail sites such as iTunes and Amazon.com after the free download expired.

As a part of international Record Store Day on April 17, 2010, 3,000 copies of "Rocket Skates" were released in a limited edition 7" vinyl format with a "picture sleeve" supporting the unofficial holiday. The vinyl edition featured a B-side remix of "Rocket Skates" by French electronic band M83. The remix was also given away as a free download to anyone who placed a pre-order for the CD version of Diamond Eyes.

A music video directed by 13thWitness was released on March 9, 2010.

Reception
The song was well received by music critics, and compared to Deftones' older and heavier material. Amy Sciarretto of Noisecreep claimed the song was "heavier than granite and very Deftones circa '98", while Annie Zaleski of Riverfront Times stated, "Calling it 'heavy' doesn't do it justice".

Track listing
Digital single
 "Rocket Skates" – 4:14
7" single
 "Rocket Skates" – 4:14
 "Rocket Skates (M83 Remix)" – 5:45

Chart positions

Personnel
Deftones
 Stephen Carpenter – guitars
 Abe Cunningham – drums
 Frank Delgado – keyboards, samples
 Chino Moreno – vocals
 Sergio Vega – bass guitar

Production and recording
 Paul Figueroa – engineering
 Ted Jensen – mastering
 Nick Raskulinecz – producer, mixing

Artwork and design
 Frank Maddocks – art direction and design
 Ryan McVay (Getty Images) – original cover photo

References

External links
"Rocket Skates" music video at Yahoo! Music

Deftones songs
2010 singles
Record Store Day releases
2010 songs
Reprise Records singles
Songs written by Stephen Carpenter
Songs written by Abe Cunningham
Songs written by Chino Moreno
Songs written by Sergio Vega (bassist)
Songs written by Frank Delgado (American musician)
Song recordings produced by Nick Raskulinecz